PAX (originally known as Penny Arcade Expo) is a series of gaming culture festivals involving tabletop, arcade, and video gaming. PAX is held annually in Seattle, Boston and Philadelphia in the United States; and Melbourne in Australia. PAX was previously held annually in San Antonio in the United States.

PAX was originally created in 2004 by Jerry Holkins and Mike Krahulik, the authors of the Penny Arcade webcomic, because they wanted to attend a show exclusively for gaming. Defining characteristics of the shows include an opening keynote speech from an industry insider, game-culture inspired concerts, panels on game topics, exhibitor booths from both independent and major game developers and publishers, a LAN party multiplayer, tabletop gaming tournaments, and video game freeplay areas.

History 
The first PAX, known at the time as the Penny Arcade Expo, was held on August 28–29, 2004, in Bellevue, Washington, at the Meydenbauer Center, and was attended by approximately 3,300 people. The event was then held annually in August, at the same venue, for the next two years. Attendance grew rapidly, with over 9,000 attendees in 2005, and over 19,000 in 2006. In 2009, Penny Arcade partnered with ReedPOP.

By 2007, the event had outgrown its previous venue, and moved to the Washington State Convention and Trade Center, with a total attendance of 39,000. Attendance continued to grow to 58,500 in 2008, and 60,750 in 2009, and 70,000 in 2011. The show stopped reporting attendance numbers in 2011, citing difficulties in tracking attendance in a multi-day event.

PAX Prime 2013 was the first four-day PAX and took place from August 30 to September 2, 2013. Passes for PAX Prime 2013 sold out within six hours.

Expansion to additional cities
In 2010, Penny Arcade hosted its first event outside of Seattle. PAX East was held in Boston, from March 26–28, 2010, at the Hynes Convention Center. With an attendance of 52,290, PAX East rivaled the newly dubbed "PAX Prime" in Washington, which saw 67,600 attendees in 2010. This venue was moved to Boston Convention and Exhibition Center in 2011. An agreement reached in early 2012 committed Boston as the home of PAX East until 2023.

2013 marked the first international expansion for PAX.  PAX Australia 2013 was held July 19–21, 2013, at the Melbourne Showgrounds. The following year it moved to the Melbourne Convention and Exhibition Centre, where it has been confirmed to remain until at least 2022.

The first PAX South was held in San Antonio, Texas at the Henry B. Gonzalez Convention Center on January 23–25, 2015. It set a PAX record for highest attendance for an inaugural year.  In October 2021, ReedPop announced that PAX South would be discontinued, citing that the event had not seen significant growth since its inaugural edition.

New verticals 

In 2011, Penny Arcade launched PAX Dev, a new event exclusive to the game developer community to "speak freely and focus entirely on their trade". Differentiating itself from other game developer events like GDC, PAX Dev does not allow press. 750 people attended in 2011.

At PAX South 2017, Penny Arcade and ReedPop announced that a new event type, PAX Unplugged, would be held on November 17–19, 2017, at the Pennsylvania Convention Center in Philadelphia. The event was designed as a tabletop-exclusive convention, a gaming segment which was only incidental in other PAXes.

Name of PAX in Seattle 

PAX was originally known as the "Penny Arcade Expo", a Seattle-only event, but quickly became known by its acronym "PAX". As part of an expansion into new cities, Seattle's PAX was renamed "PAX Prime" in 2010. On November 18, 2015, it was silently confirmed that PAX Prime was being renamed to PAX West.

Activities 

PAX consists of the following activities:

 Freeplay, further broken into: Console, Classic Console, Handheld, PC, VR, and Tabletop.
 Tournaments, further broken into: Console and Tabletop. Some PAXes feature additional tournaments hosted by vendors.
 "Bring Your Own Computer" or BYOC, a LAN Party.
 Panels, talks, signings, and similar events.
 Concerts.
 PAX Arena, an eSports tournament.
 The Omegathon.
 An Exhibition Hall, which includes game studios, merchandise, and the Indie Megabooth.

The Omegathon 

Each PAX features an event called the "Omegathon", a festival-long tournament consisting of a group of randomly selected attendees competing in a game bracket for a grand prize (which has varied from a large game bundle, to a trip to Japan, to a trip to any PAX in the world). The final round of the Omegathon makes up part of the closing ceremonies of PAX. Past games for the final round of the Omegathon have included Tetris, Pong, Halo 3, and skee-ball.

Enforcers 

Early PAXes were largely run by a large group of volunteers, which the show calls "Enforcers". Now a paid role, most Enforcers are still not professional conference organizers or temps, but rather selected from an application available to attendees on the PAX website.

Events

Active PAX Events

Former PAX Events

Timeline of PAX Events

See also
 E3
 ChinaJoy
 DreamHack

References

External links
 
 

PAX (event)
Annual events in Boston
Culture of Seattle
Esports tournaments
Festivals in Seattle
Gaming conventions
LAN parties
Multigenre conventions
Expo
Recurring events established in 2004
2004 establishments in Washington (state)
Seattle Area conventions